Bloomington Park is a  public park in Portland, Oregon's Lents neighborhood, in the United States. The park was acquired in 1940.

References

External links

 

1940 establishments in Oregon
Lents, Portland, Oregon
Parks in Portland, Oregon
Protected areas established in 1940